In proof theory, a branch of mathematical logic, proof mining (or proof unwinding) is a research program that studies or analyzes formalized proofs, especially in analysis, to obtain explicit bounds, ranges or rates of convergence from proofs that, when expressed in natural language, appear to be nonconstructive.
This research has led to improved results in analysis obtained from the analysis of classical proofs.

References

Further reading 

 Ulrich Kohlenbach and Paulo Oliva, "Proof Mining: A systematic way of analysing proofs in mathematics", Proc. Steklov Inst. Math, 242:136–164, 2003
 Paulo Oliva, "Proof Mining in Subsystems of Analysis", BRICS PhD thesis citeseer

Proof theory